Sorbus rupicola, known as rock whitebeam, is a rare shrub or small tree best known from the British Isles but also reported from Norway, Sweden and Russia.

Reaching heights of 10 m, it grows in rocky woodland, scrub and cliffs, usually on limestone.

The species reproduces apomictically (asexually via cloned seeds) and was presumably created by autopolyploidysation of the common whitebeam proper (Sorbus aria s.str.). It contains a tetraploidal set of chromosomes (2n=4x=68).

Sorbus rupicola is a member of Sorbus aria agg.,  which contains 20 subspecies. A key to this aggregate is given in Stace - though be warned Stace states "It is probably impossible to construct a reliable key to the agg."! Stace gives Sorbus rupicola the following characteristics:
 Leaves unlobed or lobed ≤1/20 of the way to the midrib.
 Leaves with a single style of teeth or, weakly, two styles of teeth.
 Leaves with 6 to 9 (rarely 4 to 10) pairs of lateral veins.
 Leaves mostly 1.6 to 2.4 times longer than wide.
 Leaves mostly widest in that half of the leaf furthest from the stalk.
 Leaves usually obtuse (rarely acute) at apex.
 Leaves have dense white hairs on lower surface.
 Fruits 10-15mm across, warty.

References

Further reading

External links
Distribution map of S. rupicola. Naturhistoriska riksmuseet.

rupicola
Flora of Europe